Lochem is a city and municipality in the province of Gelderland in the Eastern Netherlands. In 2005, it merged with the municipality of Gorssel, retaining the name of Lochem. As of 2019, it had a population of 33,590.

Population centres 

The city of Lochem is the municipality's main population centre. The hamlet of Barchem and Laren were already comprised in the municipality of Lochem before 2005. Formerly in the municipality of Gorssel, Almen, Eefde (immediately north of Zutphen), Epse and Gorssel itself became part of the municipality of Lochem, as well as the hamlet of Harfsen.

City of Lochem
Until the 17th century, it was often besieged and burnt down. After 1700, it became a small market town for the farmers in its surroundings.

The village of Laren has a castle called Huis Verwolde. In summer, guided tours of this castle are organised for tourists. On its estate there is a tree, said to be the thickest tree in the Netherlands ( "de dikke boom van Verwolde").

Transport 
Lochem is served by Lochem railway station, on the Zutphen–Glanerbeek railway.

Notable people 
 Johan van Dorth (1574 in Salvador – 1624), schout of Lochem and nobleman and general of the Dutch Republic
 Robert Jasper van der Capellen (1743 in Eefde – 1814) a scion from the noble regenten family Van der Capellen from Guelders
 Carel de Villeneuve (1897 in Lochem – 1974) a lawyer and director of business associations in colonial Indonesia during the 1920s–1940s
 Hans Jorritsma (born 1949 in Lochem) a retired field hockey player, competed at the 1976 Summer Olympics
 Irma Boom (born 1960 in Lochem) a Dutch graphic designer—who specializes in book making

Gallery

References

External links

Official website

 
Municipalities of Gelderland
Populated places in Gelderland
Cities in the Netherlands
Achterhoek